Riesbeck may refer to:

 Riesbeck's Food Markets, an American grocery chain with locations in Ohio and West Virginia
 Robert Riesbeck, CEO of American consumer electronics retailer hhgregg